Colin Eatock is a Canadian composer, author and journalist who lives in Toronto, Ontario.

Life and career
Eatock was born in Hamilton, Ontario, in 1958, and attended the University of Western Ontario, McMaster University and The University of Toronto, from which he received a PhD in musicology.

Eatock's music has been performed in Canada, the US and Europe. He is an associate member of the Canadian Music Centre, which released a CD of his compositions entitled "Colin Eatock: Chamber Music" in 2012 on its Centrediscs label. This CD contains six of his compositions: his Ashes of Soldiers (2010), Suite for Piano (1995), Tears of Gold (2000), Three Songs from Blake's "America" (1987), Three Canzonas for Brass Quartet (1991), and The Lotos-Eaters (2000).

Eatock has written for Toronto's The Globe and Mail newspaper, and also the National Post, The New York Times, the Houston Chronicle, the Kansas City Star and the San Antonio Express News, as well as numerous magazines and journals in Canada, the US and the UK.

He has also written two books: the first is on the life of Felix Mendelssohn, and the second is a collection of interviews about the pianist Glenn Gould.

Published works

Books
 Eatock, Colin, "Mendelssohn and Victorian England." Ashgate Press (London, England), 2009
 Eatock, Colin, "Remembering Glenn Gould." Penumbra Press (Newcastle, Ontario), 2012.

Articles
 Eatock, Colin. "Classical Music Criticism at the Globe and Mail: 1936–2000." Canadian University Music Review (Canadian University Music Society) 24/2: 8–28.
 Eatock, Colin. "The Crystal Palace Concerts: Canon Formation and the English Musical Renaissance." 19th Century Music (University of California) 34/1: 87–105.
 Eatock, Colin. "Mendelssohn's Conversion to Judaism: An English Perspective." Mendelssohn Perspectives (Ashgate Press) 2012: 63–79.

References

External links

Canadian non-fiction writers
Canadian male composers
Living people
Journalists from Toronto
Writers from Hamilton, Ontario
Writers from Toronto
Musicians from Hamilton, Ontario
Musicians from Toronto
Canadian music critics
Year of birth missing (living people)